Gosferia was a genus of zosterophylls with curved axes and renal sporangia.  It is known from Belgium.

References 

Early Devonian plants
Zosterophylls
Prehistoric lycophyte genera